Alexander Zelikovsky is a professor of computer science at Georgia State University. He is known for an approximation algorithm for the minimum Steiner tree problem with an approximation ratio 1.55, widely cited by his peers and also widely held in libraries.

References

Georgia State University faculty
American computer scientists
Year of birth missing (living people)
Living people